Hsu Chih-shan (born 22 June 1963) is a Taiwanese retired para table tennis player. He won a bronze medal at three consecutive Paralympic Games: 1996, 2000, and 2004.

He contracted polio when he was three years old, which disabled his left leg.

References 
 

1963 births 
Living people 
Paralympic medalists in table tennis
Table tennis players at the 1992 Summer Paralympics 
Table tennis players at the 1996 Summer Paralympics 
Table tennis players at the 2000 Summer Paralympics 
Table tennis players at the 2004 Summer Paralympics 
Medalists at the 1996 Summer Paralympics 
Medalists at the 2000 Summer Paralympics 
Medalists at the 2004 Summer Paralympics 
Sportspeople from Kaohsiung
Taiwanese male table tennis players 
Paralympic bronze medalists for Chinese Taipei 
Paralympic table tennis players of Chinese Taipei
People with polio
FESPIC Games competitors
21st-century Taiwanese people